Winstanley Hall is a late 16th-century house in Winstanley, in the Metropolitan Borough of Wigan, Greater Manchester. It is listed as a Scheduled Ancient Monument and a Grade II* listed building. Originally built for the Winstanley family, the building is one of only three Tudor buildings in the Borough.

History
The hall was built in the 1560s for the Winstanley family of Winstanley; the Winstanley family were lords of the manor since at least 1252 and may have been responsible for building the moat on the site. The Winstanleys owned the hall until 1596, when the estate was sold to James Bankes, a London goldsmith and banker. Winstanley Hall has three storeys and has a date stone with a date of 1584, but this is not in situ so may not provide an accurate date for the construction of the house. Extra blocks were added in the 17th and 18th centuries. Further and extensive alterations were made in 1811-19 by Lewis Wyatt in a Jacobean style. He moved the entrance to the left flank of the hall and replacing the original entrance with a window. The final additions to the hall were made in 1843 when an extra wing was added. To the south, on lands belonging to the hall, is a small stone building which was used to house bears that provided entertainment for the hall's guests. The Winstanley Family also owned the Braunstone Hall estate in Leicestershire.

The Bankes family retained ownership of the hall until the 21st century when it was sold for private development. The hall had been kept in good condition until the 1960s when the family moved out; it was last occupied in the 1980s. As the building decayed and the cost of maintaining Winstanley Hall was too much for the family, and was sold on in 2000 with 10 acres of land. It has been reported that the new owner intended to develop the hall into private flats, and that refurbishment was held up due to problems with planning permission, although it has also been reported that no application for planning permission has been submitted. As of January 2022, the building is in poor condition and in danger of collapsing, with a leaking roof, collapsed floors, and widespread dry rot.

Access
The building is currently owned and controlled by Dorbcrest Homes.

See also

Grade II* listed buildings in Greater Manchester
Scheduled Monuments in Greater Manchester
Listed buildings in Billinge and Winstanley

References

External links 

Winstanley Hall photos on Wigan World and single photo and more photos and discussion
 

Grade II* listed buildings in Greater Manchester
Country houses in Greater Manchester
Buildings and structures in the Metropolitan Borough of Wigan
Tourist attractions in the Metropolitan Borough of Wigan
Scheduled monuments in Greater Manchester